State Route 187 (SR 187) is a  V-shaped state highway  in Maine that connects to U.S. Route 1 (US 1) at both ends; in Columbia Falls (western) and Jonesboro (eastern). SR 187 serves as the thorough route to Jonesport.

Major junctions

See also

References

External links

Floodgap Roadgap's RoadsAroundME: Maine State Route 187

187
Transportation in Washington County, Maine